The Battle of Digomi was part of a campaign launched by the Georgian king Simon I of Kartli aimed at the liberation of the capital Tbilisi from the Persians in 1567.

King Simon's troops encamped at  near Tbilisi and began preparations for a siege. The city was defended by Daut Khan, a Georgian ruler appointed by the Safavid Shah Tahmasp I. Daut Khan attempted to make a sortie with his Persian force, but was routed by Simon's cavalry and found shelter within the walls of Tbilisi Fortress. The Kartlian troops invested the fortress, but could not take it and the campaign ended unsuccessfully. The fortress remained under Persian hands.

See also 
 Safavid Empire
 List of Georgian battles
 History of Georgia

References 

Digomi 1567
Digomi 1567
Digomi
16th century in Georgia (country)
16th century in Iran